The Shenyang HU-2 Petrel is a Chinese self-launching motor-glider built by the Shenyang Sailplane Factory at Shenyang.

Design
The Petrel is a two or three-seat self-launching motor-glider made from wood and fabric that looks like a conventional high-wing monoplane. It is powered by a front-mounted  Limbach L 2000 E01 piston engine.

Specifications

References

Notes

Bibliography

Motor gliders